Dark Woods is a 2021 scripted horror fiction podcast starring Corey Stoll, Monica Raymund, and Reid Scott. It was produced by Wolf Entertainment and released on November 8, 2021 by Endeavor Content

Adaptation 
On November 15, 2021, it was announced that Universal Television will adapt it into a television series.

References 

Horror podcasts
American podcasts
Scripted podcasts
2021 podcast debuts
Audio podcasts
Podcasts adapted into television shows